The Colquiri River is a river of Bolivia in  the La Paz Department.

See also
List of rivers of Bolivia

References
Rand McNally, The New International Atlas, 1993.

Rivers of La Paz Department (Bolivia)